St. Mary's Cathedral is the seat of the Roman Catholic Diocese of Badulla. It was established on 13 September 1881. The annual feast is held on the 2nd Sunday of October. The current church was built by the Rev. Fr. Peter Farina, OSB in the 1950s.

St. Mary's Cathedral featured on Christmas postal stamps and were issued by the Sri Lankan government in 2009.

References 

1881 establishments in Asia
19th-century establishments in Ceylon
Roman Catholic churches completed in 1881
Roman Catholic cathedrals in Sri Lanka
Churches in Badulla District
20th-century Roman Catholic church buildings in Sri Lanka